Filth City is a 2017 Canadian comedy film, directed by Andy King.

The film stars Pat Thornton as Mayor Hogg, the mayor of York City who is embroiled in a political scandal. The film is loosely based on the crack cocaine scandal surrounding former Toronto mayor Rob Ford. The cast also includes Melinda Shankar, Andy King, Danny Polishchuk, Melanie Nicholls-King, Kathleen Phillips, Lenno Britos, Michael Copeman, Brian Kaulback, Kayla Lorette, Brooks Gray and Chris Locke.

The film was shot in Hamilton, Ontario in fall 2015. The film was originally scheduled to be released as a television film on Super Channel in 2016, but following that service's bankruptcy, it instead premiered theatrically at the 2017 Canadian Filmmakers' Festival.

Rob Ford's brother, Doug Ford, denounced the film and threatened King (without mentioning his name) by saying, "Make sure he is not crossing the street when I am driving down the road." King called his threat "outrageous".

Cast 

 Pat Thornton as Mayor Hogg
 Danny Polishchuk as Officer Randy Kapowski
 Andy King as Officer Phil Coke
 Melinda Shankar as Monica
 Melanie Nicholls-King as Detective Mason
 Michael Copeman Captain Lester Schultz
 Kathleen Phillips as Eve Knight
 Brian Kaulback as Detective Sgt. O'Donovan
 Kayla Lorette as Rhonda Hogg
 Brooks Gray as Gerry Popadick
 Chris Locke as Detective Ray Zitt

References

External links

2017 films
Canadian political comedy films
English-language Canadian films
Films shot in Hamilton, Ontario
Rob Ford
2010s English-language films
2010s Canadian films